SISPRE Acronym for Italian Society of Studies on Jet Propulsion (Societa Italiana Sviluppo Propulsione a Reazione).

Incorporated by Fiat Group and Finmeccanica each holding 50% of the stock and renamed CESPRE, it worked mostly for ITAF in 1953–56 to build an air-to-air missile, the C-7. In 1960 CESPRE devised and built a solid-fuel rocket for meteorological purposes, the C-41, on a 14 million liras budget. C-41 was launched in 1961 reaching an altitude of 30,000 mt. That same year SISPRE was incorporated, together with the Italian BPD, in the Società Generale Missilistica.

Sources

External links
SISPRE Rockets 

Sounding rockets
Companies of Italy